Three Kings ( or ) is a suburb of Auckland, New Zealand that is built around the Te Tātua-a-Riukiuta volcano. It is home to an ethnically diverse population of about 3,500 people.

Three Kings is located six kilometres south of the city centre, between the suburbs of Royal Oak and Mount Roskill.

Three Kings features a small shopping mall and supermarket complex called Three Kings Plaza. It also has a commercial area, and an accident and medical clinic. The Mount Roskill library is situated above the Fickling Convention Centre which hosts a wide range of community events.

Te Tātua-a-Riukiuta, also known as Three Kings, had three prominent peaks and a number of smaller peaks until most of them were quarried away, leaving a sole remaining large peak (often called Big King). It was probably the most complex volcano in the Auckland volcanic field.

Demographics

Three Kings had a population of 3,645 at the 2018 New Zealand census, an increase of 312 people (9.4%) since the 2013 census, and an increase of 372 people (11.4%) since the 2006 census. There were 1,206 households, comprising 1,743 males and 1,902 females, giving a sex ratio of 0.92 males per female, with 741 people (20.3%) aged under 15 years, 909 (24.9%) aged 15 to 29, 1,641 (45.0%) aged 30 to 64, and 357 (9.8%) aged 65 or older.

Ethnicities were 48.5% European/Pākehā, 8.6% Māori, 19.9% Pacific peoples, 29.1% Asian, and 5.3% other ethnicities. People may identify with more than one ethnicity.

The percentage of people born overseas was 40.6, compared with 27.1% nationally.

Although some people chose not to answer the census's question about religious affiliation, 42.1% had no religion, 39.3% were Christian, 0.3% had Māori religious beliefs, 2.8% were Hindu, 5.1% were Muslim, 2.1% were Buddhist and 2.5% had other religions.

Of those at least 15 years old, 1,014 (34.9%) people had a bachelor's or higher degree, and 378 (13.0%) people had no formal qualifications. 594 people (20.5%) earned over $70,000 compared to 17.2% nationally. The employment status of those at least 15 was that 1,443 (49.7%) people were employed full-time, 432 (14.9%) were part-time, and 126 (4.3%) were unemployed.

Education
Three Kings School is a contributing primary school (years 1-6) with a roll of  students. The school opened in 1878 as Mt Roskill School, and was a focal point for the Three Kings area, hosting Friday night dances, and other events such as concerts and plays. In 1943, the school changed its name to Three Kings School.

St Therese School is a state-integrated full primary Catholic school (years 1-8) with a roll of  students. The school opened in 1946, and was founded by the Sisters of St Joseph of the Sacred Heart.

Central Auckland Specialist School is a school for students with high specialist educational needs. It has a roll of  students. The school opened on 28 January 2018, after the merger of Carlson School for Cerebral Palsy and Sunnydene Special School. Sunnydene Special School originally opened in 1934 on Queen Street, and moved to Mount Roskill in 1967. Carlson Cerebral Palsy School originally opened in 1954 on Gilles Avenue in Epsom and moved to Three Kings in 1973.

All these schools are coeducational. Rolls are as of 

The local state secondary school is Mount Roskill Grammar School. Catholic students attend Marcellin College (coed), St Peter's College (boys) or Marist College (girls). The local intermediate is  Mount Roskill Intermediate.

Notable people
Phil Goff, Mayor of Auckland and former MP for the Mt Roskill electorate, attended Three Kings Primary School.

References

External links
 Description aimed at home buyers, New Zealand Herald, 2004
 QuickStats from Statistics NZ
 View of Three Kings in 1920, showing East King, with Highest King on the left
 Painting of Three Kings from 1875
 Early photo of Three Kings pa
 Photographs of Three Kings held in Auckland Libraries' heritage collections.

Suburbs of Auckland